Peter Cooke may refer to:

Peter Cooke (politician) (born 1949), American businessman and politician
Peter Cooke (sailor) (1924–2001), Kenyan sailor
Peter Cooke (Scouting), British Overseas Secretary and the Commonwealth Secretary of the Scout Association

See also
Peter Cook (disambiguation)